The Mongol Empire invaded and conquered Kievan Rus' in the mid-13th century, destroying numerous cities including the largest such as Kiev (50,000 inhabitants) and Chernigov (30,000 inhabitants), with the only major cities escaping destruction being Novgorod and Pskov, located in the north.

The campaign was heralded by the Battle of the Kalka River in May 1223, which resulted in a Mongol victory over the forces of several Rus' principalities as well as the remnants of the Cumans under Köten. The Mongols retreated, having gathered their intelligence, which was the purpose of the reconnaissance-in-force. A full-scale invasion of Rus' by Batu Khan followed, from 1237 to 1241. The invasion was ended by the Mongol succession process upon the death of Ögedei Khan. All Rus' principalities were forced to submit to Mongol rule and became vassals of the Golden Horde, some of which lasted until 1480.

The invasion, facilitated by the beginning of the breakup of Kievan Rus' in the 13th century, had profound ramifications for the history of Eastern Europe, including the division of the East Slavic people into three distinct separate nations: modern-day Belarusians, Russians, and Ukrainians, and the rise of the Grand Duchy of Moscow. Moscow started its independence struggle from the Mongols by the 14th century, ending the Mongol rule (the so-called "Mongol yoke") in 1480, and eventually growing into the Tsardom of Russia.

Background
As it was undergoing fragmentation, Kievan Rus' faced the unexpected invasion of a foreign foe coming from the mysterious regions of the Far East. "For our sins", writes the Rus' chronicler of the time, "unknown nations arrived. No one knew their origin or whence they came, or what religion they practiced. That is known only to God, and perhaps to wise men learned in books".

The princes of Rus' first heard of the coming Mongol warriors from the nomadic Cumans. The historical accounts after the initial invasion call them by the name Tartars. They were previously known for pillaging settlers on the frontier, the nomads now preferred peaceful relations, warning their neighbors: "These terrible strangers have taken our country, and tomorrow they will take yours if you do not come and help us". In response to this call, Mstislav the Bold and Mstislav Romanovich the Old joined forces and set out eastward to meet the foe, only to be routed on April 1, 1223, at the Battle of the Kalka River.

Although this defeat left the Rus' principalities at the mercy of invaders, the Mongol or Tartar forces retreated and did not reappear for thirteen years, during which time the princes of Rus' went on quarreling and fighting as before, until they were startled by a new and much more formidable invading force. In The Secret History of the Mongols, the only reference to this early battle is:

Invasion of Batu Khan

The vast Mongolian Great Khanate army of around 40,000 mounted archers, commanded by Batu Khan and Subutai, crossed the Volga River and invaded Volga Bulgaria in late 1236. It took them only a month to extinguish the resistance of the Volga Bulgars, the Cumans-Kipchaks and the Alans.

Immediately prior to the invasion, Friar Julian from Hungary had travelled to the eastern border of the Rus' and learned of the Mongol army, which was waiting for the onset of winter so that they could cross the frozen rivers and swamps. In his letter to the Pope's legate in Hungary, Julian described meeting Mongol messengers who had been detained by Yuri II of Vladimir-Suzdal on their way to Hungary. Yuri II gave their letter to Julian.

In November 1237, Batu Khan sent his envoys to the court of Yuri II and demanded his submission. According to the Laurentian Codex, the Mongols actually came seeking peace, but Yuri II treated them with disdain:

Regardless of what impression Yuri II may have given the Mongol delegations, of which several are mentioned, he did his best to avoid direct conflict. He sent them away with what were described as gifts, which were essentially tribute or bribes to keep them from invading.

The Mongols attacked from several directions. One section attacked Suzdal, one from the Volga, and another from the south towards Ryazan. According to Rashid al-Din Hamadani, the Siege of Ryazan was conducted by Batu, Orda, Güyük, Mengu Qa'an, Kulkan, Kadan, and Buri. The city fell after three days. Alarmed by the news, Yuri II sent his sons to detain the invaders, but they were defeated and ran for their lives. Yuri II also fled Vladimir for Yaroslavl. 

Having burnt down Kolomna and Moscow, the horde laid siege to Vladimir on February 4, 1238. Three days later, the capital of Vladimir-Suzdal was taken and burnt to the ground. The royal family perished in the fire, while the grand prince retreated northward. Crossing the Volga, Vladimir mustered a new army, which was encircled and totally annihilated by the Mongols in the Battle of the Sit River on March 4.

Thereupon Batu Khan divided his army into smaller units, which ransacked fourteen cities of northeastern Rus': Rostov, Uglich, Yaroslavl, Kostroma, Kashin, Ksnyatin, Gorodets, Galich, Pereslavl-Zalessky, Yuriev-Polsky, Dmitrov, Volokolamsk, Tver, and Torzhok. Chinese siege engines were used by the Mongols under Tului to raze the walls of Rus' cities. The most difficult to take was the small town of Kozelsk, whose boy-prince Vasily, son of Titus, and inhabitants resisted the Mongols for seven weeks, killing 4,000. As the story goes, at the news of the Mongol approach, the whole town of Kitezh with all its inhabitants was submerged into a lake, where, as legend has it, it may be seen to this day. The only major cities to escape destruction were Novgorod and Pskov. The Mongols planned to advance on Novgorod, but the principality was spared the fate of its brethren by the decision to preemptively surrender.

In mid-1238, Batu Khan devastated the Crimea and pacified Mordovia. In the winter of 1239, he sacked Chernihiv and Pereiaslav. After many days of siege, the horde stormed Kiev in December 1240. Despite the resistance of Danylo of Halych, Batu Khan managed to take two of his principal cities, Halych and Volodymyr. The Mongol Tartars then resolved to "reach the ultimate sea", where they could proceed no further and invaded Hungary (under Batu Khan) and Poland (under Baidar and Kaidu). Batu Khan captured Pest, and then on Christmas Day 1241, Esztergom.

Age of Mongol rule

The former Rus' principalities became part of the Jochid appanage ruled by Batu. Batu sited a semi-nomadic capital, called Sarai or Sarai Batu (Batu's Palaces), on the lower Volga. The Jochid appanage came to be known as the Golden Horde. For the next three hundred years, all of the Rus' states, including Novgorod, Smolensk, Galich and Pskov, submitted to Mongol rule, except for the Principality of Polotsk.

After Mongol and Turco-Mongol suzerainty was fought off, this period of rule by the Golden Horde is commonly referred to negatively by Russian historiography as the Mongol or Tatar "yoke". The Golden Horde Tartars instituted census, taxes, and tributes on the conquered lands, which were usually collected by local princes and brought to Sarai. 

In the 14th and 15th centuries, with the rise of the Tatar khanates, the slave raids on the Slavic population became significant, with the purpose of trading slaves with the Ottoman Empire.

Impact on development

Giovanni de Plano Carpini, the pope's envoy to the Mongol great khan, traveled through Kiev in February 1246 and wrote:

The influence of the Mongol invasion on the territories of Kievan Rus' was uneven. Colin McEvedy (Atlas of World Population History, 1978) estimates the population of Kievan Rus' dropped from 7.5 million prior to the invasion to 7 million afterwards. Centres such as Kiev took centuries to rebuild and recover from the devastation of the initial attack. The Novgorod Republic continued to prosper, and new entities, the rival cities of Moscow and Tver, began to flourish under the Mongols. 

Moscow's eventual dominance of northern and eastern Rus' was in large part attributable to the Mongols. After the prince of Tver joined a rebellion against the Mongols in 1327, his rival prince Ivan I of Moscow joined the Mongols in crushing Tver and devastating its lands. By doing so he eliminated his rival, allowed the Russian Orthodox Church to move its headquarters to Moscow, and was granted the title of Grand Prince by the Mongols.

As such, the Muscovite prince became the chief intermediary between the Mongol overlords and the Rus' lands, which paid further dividends for Moscow's rulers. While the Mongols often raided other areas of Rus', they tended to respect the lands controlled by their principal collaborator. This, in turn, attracted nobles and their servants who sought to settle in the relatively secure and peaceful Moscow lands.

Although Rus' forces defeated the Golden Horde at the Battle of Kulikovo in 1380, Mongol domination of parts of Rus' territories, with the requisite demands of tribute, continued until the Great stand on the Ugra river in 1480.

Historians argued that without the Mongol destruction of Kievan Rus', the Rus' would not have unified into the Tsardom of Russia and, subsequently, the Russian Empire would not have risen. Trade routes with the East went through Rus' territory, making them a center of trade between east and west. Mongol influence, while destructive to their enemies, had a significant long-term effect on the rise of modern Belarus, Russia, and Ukraine.

Historiography
The Mongol conquest of Rus' left a deep mark on Russian historiography. 

According to Charles J. Halperin, Fomenko and Nosovskii's popular pseudohistorical Novaia khronologiia (New Chronology) arose out of "the dilemma of the Mongol conquest in Russian historiography": embarrassment among defensive Russian nationalists who object to "Russophobic" arguments that Russia acquired "barbarian" customs, institutions, and culture from uncivilized nomads.

Influence on Rus' society

Historians have debated the long-term influence of Mongol rule on Rus' society. The Mongols have been blamed for the destruction of Kievan Rus', the breakup of the ancient Rus' nationality into three components and the introduction of the concept of "oriental despotism" into Russia. Historians also credit the Mongol regime with an important role in the development of Muscovy as a state. Under Mongol occupation, for example, Muscovy developed its mestnichestvo hierarchy, postal road network (based on Mongolian ortoo system, known in Russian as "yam", hence the terms yamshchik, Yamskoy Prikaz, etc.), census, fiscal system and military organization.

The period of Mongol rule over the former Rus' polities included significant cultural and interpersonal contacts between the Slavic and Mongolian ruling classes. By 1450, the Tatar language had become fashionable in the court of the Grand Prince of Moscow, Vasily II, who was accused of excessive love of the Tatars and their speech, and many Russian noblemen adopted Tatar surnames (for example, a member of the Veliamanov family adopted the Turkic name "Aksak" and his descendants were the Aksakovs). 

Many Russian boyar (noble) families traced their descent from the Mongols or Tatars, including Veliaminov-Zernov, Godunov, Arseniev, Bakhmetev, Bulgakov (descendants of Bulgak) and Chaadaev (descendants of Genghis Khan's son Chagatai Khan). In a survey of Russian noble families of the 17th century, over 15% of the Russian noble families had Tatar or Oriental origins.

The Mongols brought about changes in the economic power of states and overall trade. In the religious sphere, St. Paphnutius of Borovsk was the grandson of a Mongol baskak, or tax collector, while a nephew of Khan Bergai of the Golden Horde converted to Christianity and became known as the monk St. Peter Tsarevich of the Horde. 

In the judicial sphere, under Mongol influence capital punishment, which during the times of Kievan Rus' had only been applied to slaves, became widespread, and the use of torture became a regular part of criminal procedure. Specific punishments introduced in Moscow included beheading for alleged traitors and branding of thieves (with execution for a third arrest).

See also
List of battles of the Mongol invasion of Kievan Rus'
Mongol invasions of Durdzuketia

References

Further reading

 Atwood, Christopher P. Encyclopedia of Mongolia and the Mongol Empire (2004)
 Christian, David. A History of Russia, Central Asia and Mongolia Vol. 1: Inner Eurasia from Prehistory to the Mongol Empire (Blackwell, 1998)
 Halperin, Charles J. Russia, and the golden horde: the Mongol impact on medieval Russian history (Indiana University Press, 1985)
 
 Sinor, Denis. "The Mongols in the West." Journal of Asian History (1999): 1-44. in JSTOR
 Vernadsky, George. The Mongols and Russia (Yale University Press, 1953)
Halperin, Charles J. "George Vernadsky, Eurasianism, the Mongols, and Russia." Slavic Review (1982): 477–493. in JSTOR

Sources

 Full Collection of Russian Annals, St. Petersburg, 1908 and Moscow, 2001, .

 
13th century in Kievan Rus'
History of Kyiv
Rus
Invasions of Belarus
Invasions of Russia
Invasions of Ukraine
1230s conflicts
1240s conflicts
1230s in the Mongol Empire
1240s in the Mongol Empire
Batu Khan